Ana de Gonta Colaço (19031954) was a Portuguese sculptor, artist and feminist.

Early life
Ana Raymunda de Gonta Colaço was born on 7 November 1903 in the Portuguese capital of Lisbon. She was the daughter of the poet Branca de Gonta Colaço and the artist Jorge Colaço. She was known as Aninhas, and was then the couple's third daughter, being born just a year after the still birth of a sister. Her family was well-connected to the intellectual activity of the time in Portugal, and her parents were prominent figures in Portuguese society. Ana was the younger sister of the lawyer, writer and playwright Tomás Ribeiro Colaço. On her father's side she was a cousin of the pianist and composer Alexandre Rey Colaço, of the actress and stage director Amélia Rey Colaço and of the painter and illustrator Alice Rey Colaço, as well as granddaughter on the maternal side of the politician and writer Tomás Ribeiro.

Colaço's childhood was very privileged. She was taught at home by tutors specialised in a variety of disciplines, including languages, literature, music and even horse riding. She competed, together with her younger sister, Maria Christina, in national equestrian tournaments. Her childhood was also marked by the constant presence of prominent figures from high society as well as the artistic and cultural world. Her mother organized soirées and dinners at her home and Queen D. Amélia was a regular visitor. At the age of 17, Colaço began to develop her talent for sculpture, after having experimented and created small works at home, being encouraged by her father who gave her clay obtained from the Sacavém ceramics factory. Since sculpture rarely provided financial independence or was considered a good occupation for a woman, it was thanks to the support of her parents that she started taking classes.

Feminism
During the same period, Colaço began to embrace some of the ideas of feminism, starting to wear short hair, to dress in men's suits and ties and to write poems and other texts about the condition of women in Portugal. This led to speculation about her sexual orientation.  That she was a lesbian was known to her family, who tried to protect her from public scrutiny in the very conservative Portugal of the time. She would later join the feminist Conselho Nacional das Mulheres Portuguesas (National Council of Portuguese Women), together with her mother.

First exhibitions
In April 1923, Colaço exhibited her first work at the exhibition of the National Society of Fine Arts, in Lisbon. She received an honourable mention for a small statue in plaster called Onda (Wave), which illustrated a female nude lying on the foam of a wave. Reviews were mixed, with some praising the work while others criticised the artist. In 1924, she held her first solo exhibition at Salão Bobone, in Lisbon, and despite the harsh criticism she received in several newspaper articles, including one that said that "Sculpture can never be the art of a woman", the inauguration of the exhibition was attended by many personalities from the world of arts, culture, politics and Portuguese feminist activism, such as the painters Eduarda Lapa and Mily Possoz and the sculptor António Teixeira Lopes.

Training in Paris
In 1927, she graduated from the School of Cinematographic Art in Lisbon. Having developed an artistic talent, she left Lisbon for Paris in 1929, travelling via the Prado Museum in Madrid. In Paris, she joined the Julian Academy, becoming a pupil of Paul Landowski and Alfred-Alphonse Bottiau. After seven months, she was admitted to exhibit at the Salon d'Automne (Autumn Salon), with a work called Pele Vermelha (Red Skin), which represented a departure from the naturalist style she had followed in Portugal and a movement towards modernism. Recalling her childhood nickname, her works were all signed "Aninhas". During the 1930s she moved between Paris, London, Lisbon and Tangier.

Later activities
During one of her stays in Portugal, in 1930, she was invited to exhibit at an Exhibition of Ancient and Modern Feminine Work, organized by the Conselho Nacional das Mulheres Portuguesas. In 1932, she started the  Salão dos Artistas Criadores (Salon of Creative Artists), together with the painter Maria Adelaide Lima Cruz and the sculptor Maria José Dias da Câmara, with whom she at the time maintained a relationship and shared a studio in Lisbon. In 1939, she faced some controversy, having made public her relationship with the singer and actress Corina Freire. One of her works, Ouvindo o Sermão (Listening to the Sermon), was refused by the jury of the National Society of Fine Arts. Interviewed about the exhibition, she claimed that "modernism does not exist in Portugal. Nobody knows what it is". Nevertheless, she was invited to exhibit at the Portuguese World Exhibition in Lisbon in 1940, where she exhibited a bas-relief based on a literary character of her grandfather.

Death
After her mother's death in 1945, Colaço began to show signs of poor health, choosing to settle in the family home, where she continued to produce works of art and wrote texts on the condition of women in Portuguese society. Her last work, a monumental sculpture of the Assumption of Mary, was commissioned by the parish of Aguiar da Beira in the north of Portugal. She died on 25 December 1954, at the home of her younger sister. She was buried in the Prazeres Cemetery in Lisbon. Despite her relatively small output, she continues to be exhibited.

References

1903 births
1954 deaths
Portuguese women sculptors
Portuguese feminists
Portuguese lesbian artists
Portuguese LGBT sculptors
Lesbian sculptors
20th-century Portuguese LGBT people